Vistra is a corporate services company headquartered in Hong Kong.

History
Vistra was established in Hong Kong in 1986 (as OIL) and quickly grew its service offerings and expanded its geographic coverage. In 2011 OIL merged with Vistra before completely rebranding to Vistra in 2017.

Offshore 2020
The Offshore 2020 was annual market research conducted by OIL. The research focused on the key trends and future developments of the offshore and related industries, and reviewed issues such as market drivers and constraints, impact of the increasing regulations and jurisdictional popularity. The last Offshore 2020 was published in December 2015.

In 2017 Offshore 2020 was rebranded as Vistra 2020.

Previous Publications:
 “Looking forward: An industry on the move”, 2014 edition
 “Perception and Reality: Forces driving the offshore industry”, 2013 edition
 “Opportunities and Challenges Facing the Offshore Industry”, 2012 edition
 “Insights into future trends and structure of the offshore industry”, 2011 edition
 "Insights into the evolution of offshore financial services in the region and what is driving it, 2010 edition

See also
 Offshore Financial Centre

References

External links
 Vistra official website

Offshore finance
Service companies of Hong Kong
Financial services companies established in 1986
Business services companies established in 1986
Market research organizations